Free education is education funded through government spending or charitable organizations rather than tuition funding. Many models of free higher education have been proposed. Primary school and other comprehensive or compulsory education is free in many countries (often not including primary textbook). Tertiary education is also free in certain countries, including post-graduate studies in the Nordic countries. The Article 13 of International Covenant on Economic, Social and Cultural Rights ensures the right to free education at primary education and progressive introduction of it at secondary and higher education as the right to education.

At the University of Oslo, there is no tuition fee except a small semester fee of NOK(600) (US$74). From 2013 in Northern Europe, Estonia started providing free higher education as well. Sweden, until the early 21st century, provided free education to foreign students but changes have been introduced to charge fees to foreign students from outside the European community. Denmark also has universal free education, and provides a monthly stipend, the "Statens Uddannelsesstøtte" or "SU", to students over 18 years of age or students who are under 18 and attending a higher education. Bachelor and master's degree programmes in Denmark are offered in either Danish or English depending on the programme or university. Argentina, Brazil, Cuba, Poland, Czech Republic, Greece, Hungary, Lebanon, Turkey, Sri Lanka and Uruguay provide free education at all levels, including college and university for citizens.

Countries
In Argentina, education is free since 1949 in every public university, not only for Argentine students, but also for international students willing to study in Argentina. Free education is financed by the Ministry of Education.

In Bangladesh, article 17 of  Constitution of Bangladesh provides that all children receive free and compulsory education. Primary and secondary education is financed by the state and free of charge in public schools. The government provides free textbooks to all primary and secondary-level students. In 2022, 347,016,277 free textbooks have been distributed among 41,726,856 students across the country. The government provides free school meals to 400,000 children in 2,000 schools across 16 sub-districts.

In Brazil, free education is offered by the Ministry of Education, which offers scholarships for graduate degrees, masters, doctoral and post-doctoral for Brazilians and immigrants who have Brazilian citizenship. The best universities and research centers are public institutions, financed by either the local state (state universities) or the federal government (federal universities). Graduate students can get paid if they qualify for the incentive but competition is extremely fierce. There has been a proliferation in the last 10 years of private universities which are interested in providing professional training to their undergraduates. These private colleges are not interested in nurturing research centers, since it is not part of their business model to get involved with research.

There are examples of steps towards free education being taken across the world primarily in those nations developing rapidly, such as China.

In European Union countries such as France and Malta, tuition is usually free for European students, and in Germany, tuition is free for all European and international students. In Scotland, university tuition is free for all Scottish nationals and is discounted for all European students, except from students coming from other parts of the United Kingdom.

In Fiji the government announced in 2013 it would cover the costs of primary and secondary school education, equivalent to 250 Fiji dollars per year per student.

In Iran, most prestigious universities are called governmental universities which offer free education for students who pass a very competitive entrance exam with high scores. Graduates from these universities are obliged to serve the country for as many years as they studied for their degree, in order to get their diploma.

In Mauritius, the government provides free education to its citizens from pre-primary to tertiary levels. Since July 2005, the government also introduced free transport for all students.

In New Zealand, the Labour government will introduce three years of free post-school study or training. From January 1, 2018, new students will have one year free for entering study or training. From 2021, those starting tertiary education would get two years free, and from 2024 three years. The overall cost of the package is $6 billion. Labour has also pledged to increase student allowances by $50 a week, and to restore post-graduate students' eligibility for student allowances.

In the Philippines, public primary and secondary schools are free of tuition. The 1935 Constitution provided for universal primary education. Primary education was made free under the 1973 Constitution, while the 1987 Constitution extended free education to the secondary level. Free public tertiary education has been enacted in 2017.

In Russia, prior to the break-up of the Soviet Union, tuition was free for everyone obtaining sufficient grades. Since 1991, if a student obtains sufficient grades, he or she is still eligible for a free education (on a competitive basis) in state or private universities, but he/she can also pay for studying if grades are above minimal threshold, but not enough to be enrolled into desired university for free.

In Sri Lanka, free education is provided by the government at different levels. Government funded schools such as national schools, provincial schools and Piriven provided primary and secondary education free, while assisted schools and semi-governmental schools provided the same at subsidized rates. At the university level, the  universities provide undergraduate courses free, however, this totals only about 10% for those qualified for university entrance. Grants and scholarships are provided for a limited number of study allowances. Dr. C. W. W. Kannangara who was the Minister of Education made education free for all Sri Lankan students in 1940 s. Kannangara's significant achievements in areas of education have led him to being commonly referred to as the Father of Free Education in Sri Lanka.

In Thailand, free education began around in 1996.

Trinidad and Tobago offers free tertiary education to its citizens up to the undergraduate level at accredited public and select private institutions. Postgraduate degrees are paid up to 50% by the government at accredited institutions. This benefit is given to the citizens under a programme called Government Assisted Tuition Expenses Programme and it is managed by the Funding and Grants Administration Division of the Ministry of Tertiary Education and Skills Training

In the United States, a variety of financial aid programs provide grants and student loans, mostly to low-income students, for any accredited college or university. Various proposals at the state and federal level have been made to make either community colleges or all colleges and universities free for students at all income levels. In March 2022, the U.S. state of New Mexico waived tuition for in-state students at all income levels and at all public state and tribal colleges and universities, if registered for six credit-hours and earning a minimum 2.5 GPA.

Uruguay adopted free, compulsory, and secular education in 1876, after a reform led by José Pedro Varela during the Lorenzo Latorre dictatorship. The University of the Republic follows the same principles, although graduates must pay a yearly contribution.

In Tanzania, the government introduced a fee free education for all the government schools in 2016. Government would pay the fees, however parents were required to pay for the school uniform and other materials.

History
In the Islamic Golden Age a tradition of free madrasa-based education arose.

Free education has long been identified with "sponsored education"; for example, during the Renaissance, rich dignitaries commonly sponsored the education of young men as patrons.

Thomas Jefferson proposed "establishing free schools to teach reading, writing, and arithmetic, and from these schools those of intellectual ability, regardless of background or economic status, would receive a college education paid for by the state."

In the United States, Townsend Harris founded the first free public institution of higher education, the Free Academy of the City of New York (today the City College of New York), in 1847; it aimed to provide free education to the urban poor, immigrants and their children. Its graduates went on to receive 10 Nobel Prizes, more than any other public university. During the late 19th century, the United States government introduced compulsory education as free or universal education, which extended across the country by the 1920s.

In 1944 U.S. President Franklin Delano Roosevelt signed the Serviceman's Readjustment Act, also known as the GI Bill of Rights, into law. The GI Bill allowed World War II veterans to attend universities at no cost to them.

A report regarding free higher education was prepared by President Truman in 1947, however, no action was taken, according to what was written in the report. Therefore, it never became a reality. One possible reason could be the ongoing Cold War at that time, which made President Truman shift his focus from the report to the war-defense spending.

Governments typically fund compulsory education through taxes. Aggravated truancy can be prosecuted. Homeschooling, private or parochial schooling usually offer legal alternatives.

With the start of many free internet-based learning institutions such as edX (founded in 2012) and MITx (announced in 2011), anyone in the world with Internet access can take free education-courses. In many countries, the policy for the merit system has not yet caught up with these recent advances in education technology.

After the 2011–13 Chilean student protests, tuition-free college was a major campaign promise of Chilean president Michelle Bachelet in 2013. After some years marshaling support and funding, the gratuidad law was passed in 2018, and as of 2019 covers tuition at participating schools for families in the bottom 60% of earnings nation-wide.

On the Internet
Online education has become an option in recent years, particularly with the development of free MOOCs (massive open online courses) from providers such as Khan Academy (High School) and Higher Education, through providers such as edX, Coursera, Udacity, FutureLearn and Alison. Free education has become available through several websites with some resembling the courses of study of accredited universities. Online education faces barriers such as institutional adoption, license or copyright restrictions, incompatibility and educator awareness of available resources.

Due to the extensive requirements of resources for online education, many open community projects have been initiated. Specifically, the Wikimedia Foundation has developed a project devoted to free online educational resources, Wikiversity, and recently, several other sites for specific topics have developed.

Christian Leaders Institute offers tuition free college level ministry education. Students can take any classes free of charge, but are encouraged to help support the mission of the institution by making donations to this 501 (c)3  United States Charity.

The Islamic Open University (IOU), a distance-learning higher education institution, offers tuition-free graduate and undergraduate degrees. A very modest registration fee is charged per semester, which is based on the human development index and thus varies from country to country. The IOU is offering one million scholarships for African youths by 2020.

Nidahas Vidyalaya has started an initiative named Freedom College towards providing tuition-free education in Sri Lanka.

Other examples
Many students do not attend college because they cannot afford it. A study shows that eligible and skilled students who are worried about the increasing cost of college are 12 to 16 times more likely to quit college.

Free education does not only take the form of publicly funded institutions like state universities.

In France, philosopher Michel Onfray created the first non-governmental free education university since antiquity, in 2002, with his Université populaire de Caen in Normandy. His decision was triggered by the accession of far-right party Front National to the second round of the 2002 French presidential elections. Onfray stated that people need more political, historical and philosophical background education to be more conscious citizens. His university is run by an association loi 1901.

In Iran, Nasra is a movement aiming to meet the learning needs of all children, youth and adults in 2018. This social movement focuses on digital media use and mental health and increase the skills of using the media for the public.

See also

Education For All
Education Index
Equality of opportunity
Free content
Free university
Gift economy
Global Text
Gratis versus libre
MIT OpenCourseWare
National Campaign Against Fees and Cuts
OpenCourseWare
Open education
Open educational resources
Open source curriculum
Right to education
Scholarship
Tuition freeze
Tuition payments

References

Education issues
Education

de:Schulgeldfreiheit